Chester Castle  is a civil parish in Cheshire West and Chester, England.  It contains 16 buildings that are recorded in the National Heritage List for England as designated listed buildings.   Of these, six are listed at  Grade I, the highest of the three grades, and the others are at Grade II, the lowest grade.  The parish contains the area occupied by Chester Castle and includes what is left of the castle, the buildings that replaced it, and walls surrounding it or close to it.

Key

Buildings

References

Citations

Sources

Listed buildings in Chester
Lists of listed buildings in Cheshire